Thomas Charles Hunter Hedderwick (1850 –  6 February 1918) was a Liberal Party politician in Scotland who served as the member of parliament (MP) for Wick Burghs from 1896 to 1900.

Life
He was the son of the newspaper proprietor James Hedderwick and Ellen Ness.

His first electoral contest was when he unsuccessfully fought South Lanarkshire at the 1892 general election.

In his time in Wick Burghs he had a number of fairly close contests with the Liberal Unionists.  He fought the seat unsuccessfully at the 1895 general election, won it at a by-election in 1896, but lost it at the 1900 general election. A petition was lodged relating to the 1900 election, but it was withdrawn.

In the January 1910 general election he stood as the parliamentary candidate for the Liberal Party in Newbury, but was not elected.

References

External links 
 
 

1850 births
1918 deaths
Members of the Parliament of the United Kingdom for Highland constituencies
Scottish Liberal Party MPs
UK MPs 1895–1900